The 1943 Argentine Primera División was the 52nd season of top-flight football in Argentina. The season began on April 18 and ended on December 5.

Boca Juniors won its 11th league title while Gimnasia y Esgrima (LP) was relegated.

League standings

References

Argentine Primera División seasons
Argentine Primera Division
Primera Division